Dark Fields is a Canadian–American horror film directed by Mark McNabb and Al Randall, written by Randall, and starring Jenna Scott, Lindsay Dell, Eric Phillion, Brian Austin Jr., and Ryan Hulshof as teens hunted down by a psychopathic farmer played by Al Randall. Filmed in October 2003, on a budget of $1,000, it was not released until September 2006.

Plot 

After their car runs out of gas, a group of teens steal gas from an isolated house.  Unknown to them, the owner of the house, Farmer Brown, had a traumatic past involving gasoline thieves.  Farmer Brown goes insane with rage and hunts down the teens, one by one, and kills them.

Cast

Release 
Lionsgate released Dark Fields on September 12, 2006.

Reception 
Steve Anderson of Film Threat rated it 1/5 stars and wrote, "I don't believe I ever want to see the barrel that Lions Gate had to scrape the bottom of to dredge up this roaring suckfest."  Scott Foy of Dread Central rated it 1/5 stars and called it a boring, pointless film with poorly written characters.

References

External links 
 

2006 films
2006 horror films
American independent films
American slasher films
Lionsgate films
Canadian independent films
Canadian slasher films
English-language Canadian films
2000s English-language films
2000s American films
2000s Canadian films